Walter Maxfield Lea (February 10, 1874 – January 10, 1936) was a Prince Edward Island politician.

A farmer and livestock breeder by profession, Lea was born in Tryon, the son of William C. Lea and Annie Murphy. He was elected to the provincial House of Assembly in 1915 as a Liberal and became commissioner of agriculture in 1919. In 1930 Lea became premier when his predecessor was appointed to the Supreme Court of Prince Edward Island but the Great Depression took a toll on the government's popularity and he lost the election the next year to the rival Conservative Party of Prince Edward Island.

Lea rebuilt the party while in opposition and in 1935 the Liberals won all 30 seats in the legislature, the first time such a thing had ever happened in the British Empire. Lea had been ill during the campaign, however, and died in office at the Prince Edward Island Hospital in Charlottetown on January 10, 1936.

He married Helena Esma Maude Mary Rodgerson in 1899. His daughter Marion married Walter Fitz-Alan Stewart.

References 
 

1874 births
1936 deaths
People from Prince County, Prince Edward Island
Premiers of Prince Edward Island
Prince Edward Island Liberal Party MLAs
Prince Edward Island Liberal Party leaders